Balanites maughamii (manduro, torchwood) is a protected tree in South Africa. Groendoring, a community outside Asab in Southern Namibia is named after this tree.

References

maughamii
Endemic flora of South Africa
Protected trees of South Africa